Benton Island is an ice-covered island about  long, lying  northwest of Nolan Island in the Marshall Archipelago. It was mapped by the United States Geological Survey from surveys and from U.S. Navy air photos, 1959–65, and named by the Advisory Committee on Antarctic Names for William T. Benton, BM1, U.S. Navy, Boatswain's Mate aboard  along this coast, 1961–62.

See also 
 List of Antarctic and sub-Antarctic islands

References 

Islands of Marie Byrd Land